"Next to You" is the fifth single by melody. under the Toy's Factory label released January 12, 2005. The single stayed on the Oricon for 6 weeks and peaked at number 14. To date, the single has sold 21,876 copies.

Track listing
 Next to You (4:37)
 Summer Memory (4:27)
 So into You (Only One Remix) (3:14)
 Next to You (instrumental) (4:35)

Melody (Japanese singer) songs
2005 songs
Toy's Factory singles